Tricleidus is an extinct genus of cryptoclidid plesiosaur known from only specimen (BMNH R3539) from the middle Jurassic of United Kingdom. It was first named by Andrews in 1909 and the type species is Tricleidus seeleyi.

See also

 List of plesiosaur genera
 Timeline of plesiosaur research

References

Cryptoclidids
Middle Jurassic plesiosaurs of Europe
Fossil taxa described in 1909
Taxa named by Charles William Andrews
Oxford Clay
Sauropterygian genera